Lumpiang keso is a Filipino deep-fried appetizer consisting of a stick of cheese wrapped in a thin egg crêpe. It is more commonly known as cheese sticks, cheese lumpia, or cheese turon. It is usually served warm and crispy, with a dipping sauce made from a mixture of banana ketchup and mayonnaise. It can also be served with garlic mayonnaise or sweet chili sauce. 

The recipe merely involves rolling a large stick of cheese (usually processed cheese or cheddar) in a lumpia wrapper (the thin kind). They are cooked quickly, usually less than 2 minutes. Ideally, the cheese or the entire lumpia is chilled or even frozen before cooking as this prevents the cheese from melting completely upon frying. Alternatively, the lumpia wrapper can be rolled tightly to prevent the cheese from leaking out. The thickness of the roll varies from very thin and long, to thick and stubby. It is optionally sprinkled with cheese powder.

Lumpiang keso is a type of lumpia. The dish is easy to modify, and variants may use other types of cheese like cream cheese or add milk to moisten the cheese. Other types of lumpia may also use cheese, like dinamita and lumpiang Shanghai, but these are considered separate dishes altogether. Lumpiang keso is a popular snack for children. It is also commonly served as finger food with beer or other alcoholic drinks.

See also
Tequeño
Dinamita
Sigara böreği
Lumpiang Shanghai
Siopao
Mozzarella sticks

References

Further reading

Philippine cuisine
Deep fried foods
Appetizers